Star Wars: The Force Awakens (also known as Star Wars: Episode VII – The Force Awakens) is a 2015 American epic space opera film produced, co-written, and directed by J. J. Abrams. The sequel to Return of the Jedi (1983), it is the seventh film in the "Skywalker Saga". Set thirty years after Return of the Jedi, The Force Awakens follows Rey, Finn, Poe Dameron, and Han Solo's search for Luke Skywalker and their fight in the Resistance, led by General Leia Organa and veterans of the Rebel Alliance, against Kylo Ren and the First Order, a successor to the Galactic Empire. The ensemble cast includes Harrison Ford, Mark Hamill, Carrie Fisher, Adam Driver, Daisy Ridley, John Boyega, Oscar Isaac, Lupita Nyong'o, Andy Serkis, Domhnall Gleeson, Anthony Daniels, Peter Mayhew, and Max von Sydow.

The Force Awakens premiered in Los Angeles on December 14, 2015, and was released in the United States on December 18. Made on a production budget of $259–306million, The Force Awakens earned $2.068billion worldwide, breaking numerous box office records, and finishing its theatrical run as the highest-grossing film of 2015 and the third-highest-grossing film of all time. On the review aggregator website Rotten Tomatoes, the film holds an approval rating of  based on  reviews.

The film has received various awards and nominations. It received five nominations at the 88th Academy Awards, including Best Original Score. The Force Awakens was selected by the American Film Institute as one of their top choices for the organization's annual top ten films list. It won eight of fifteen nominations at the 42nd Saturn Awards.

Accolades

Notes

References

External links
 

J. J. Abrams
Lists of accolades by film
Star Wars lists
Star Wars: The Force Awakens